Apoorv Wankhade (born 14 March 1992) is an Indian cricketer who plays for the Vidarbha. He made his first-class debut for Vidarbha in the 2012–13 Ranji Trophy on 2 November 2012. In January 2018, he was bought by the Kolkata Knight Riders in the 2018 IPL auction. He has also played for Mumbai Indians and Kolkata Knight Riders in the Indian Premier League.

References

External links
 

1992 births
Living people
Indian cricketers
Vidarbha cricketers
Kolkata Knight Riders cricketers
Mumbai Indians cricketers
Cricketers from Maharashtra